Pathompol Charoenrattanapirom (born 21 April 1994) is a Thai professional footballer who plays as a winger for Thai League 1 club Port.

Club career

BG Pathum United 
On 14 December 2020, Pathompol signed for Thai League 1 club, BG Pathum United.

International career
On 12 April 2021, He was named in manager Akira Nishino’s 47-man squad for Thailand’s 2022 World Cup qualification. In 2021 he was called up by Thailand national team for the 2020 AFF Championship.

International goals

Honours

Club
Chiangrai United
 Thai FA Cup: 2017
 Thailand Champions Cup: 2018

BG Pathum United
 Thai League 1: 2020–21
 Thailand Champions Cup: 2021, 2022

International
Thailand
 AFF Championship: 2020

References

External links

1994 births
Living people
Pathompol Charoenrattanapirom
Pathompol Charoenrattanapirom
Pathompol Charoenrattanapirom
Pathompol Charoenrattanapirom
Pathompol Charoenrattanapirom
Pathompol Charoenrattanapirom
Pathompol Charoenrattanapirom
Pathompol Charoenrattanapirom
Pathompol Charoenrattanapirom
Pathompol Charoenrattanapirom
Pathompol Charoenrattanapirom
Pathompol Charoenrattanapirom
Association football wingers